St. Mary's Canossian College is a Catholic girls secondary school in Tsim Sha Tsui, Kowloon, Hong Kong. The school was founded in 1900, and is situated at the junction of Austin Road and Chatham Road South.

The school, known as St Mary's School in the past, was originally aimed at educating the Portuguese girls living in Kowloon, Hong Kong. In 2010, the school's main building and St. Michael Building were both confirmed to be Grade I historic buildings in Hong Kong. Other Catholic buildings, like the Rosary Church and the St. Mary's Canossian School, are adjacent to the school.

School history

St. Mary's Canossian College was founded in 1900 by the Institute of the Canossian Daughters of Charity, a Catholic religious institute founded by Magdalen of Canossa of the ancient noble family of Verona, Italy. Magdalen was canonised on 2 October 1988 for her sanctity and is honoured by the Church as St. Magdalen of Canossa.

The school started with only two classrooms for boys and girls in response to the need for a school in Tsim Sha Tsui, Kowloon. The small school admitted 30 pupils and was named St. Mary's School. The school developed rapidly as the population in Kowloon grew. In 1960 the enrolment was 2500 including the Primary Section. In the same year the Secondary Section was named "St. Mary's Canossian College", a grant-in-aid school for girls while the Primary Section was renamed "St. Mary's Canossian School".

Exam results 
St. Mary's Canossian College has produced 2 perfect scorers "10As" in the history of Hong Kong Certificate of Education Examination (HKCEE) and 5 "Top Scorers" and "Super Top Scorers" in the history of Hong Kong Diploma of Secondary Education Examination (HKDSE).

7 x 5** "Top Scorers" are candidates who obtained perfect scores of 5** in each of the four core subjects and three electives.

8 x 5** "Super Top Scorers" are candidates who obtained seven Level 5** in four core subjects and three electives, and an additional Level 5** in the Mathematics Extended (M1/M2) module.

Notable alumni
Teresa Cheng, Secretary for Justice
 Fanny Law, Permanent Secretary for Education and Manpower 
 Maggie Cheung Ho-yee, actress
 Sonija Kwok, actress
 Natalie Wong, actress
 Mandy Cho, actress
 Kearen Pang, director
 Gloria Chang, activist
 Adrienne Lau, singer

References

Sources

School Homepage
Primary School Homepage

Girls' schools in Hong Kong
Secondary schools in Hong Kong
Catholic secondary schools in Hong Kong
Through Train schools
Grade I historic buildings in Hong Kong
Tsim Sha Tsui East
Educational institutions established in 1900
Canossian educational institutions
1900 establishments in Hong Kong